is a brackish lake on the Sado Island in the Sea of Japan off the west coast of Honshu, Japan. The lake is the largest of Niigata prefecture.

Originally Lake Kamo was a fresh water lake, but was opened to the sea during the Meiji period to avoid floods, and the water became brackish. The lake is famous for oyster farming, since 1932.

Lake Kamo is ranked among the top 100 Landscapes of Japan.

References

External links 
 Lake Kamo - Sado Tourism Association

Kamo
Landforms of Niigata Prefecture